The Bara Rifles are a paramilitary regiment forming part of the Frontier Corps Khyber Pakhtunkhwa (North) of Pakistan. The name alludes to the Bara River and Bara Tehsil (a subdivision of Khyber Pakhtunkhwa province). The Rifles are tasked with defending the border with Afghanistan and assisting with law enforcement in the districts adjacent to the border. This includes collaborations with civilian police forces to intercept illegal drug shipments.

Training
The regiment has been involved in training for new Khasadars (a tribal police force in the now defunct Federally Administered Tribal Areas), who are gradually being incorporated into the civilian Khyber Pakhtunkhwa Police.

Units
 Headquarters Wing
 161 Wing
 162 Wing
 163 Wing
 164 Wing
 165 Wing
 166 Wing
 Special Operation Group

References

Regiments of the Frontier Corps
Frontier Corps Khyber Pakhtunkhwa (North)